Nouvelle adresse is a Canadian television drama series, which premiered in 2014 on Ici Radio-Canada Télé. Created by Richard Blaimert, the series focuses on Nathalie Lapointe (Macha Grenon), a single mother in her early forties whose terminal cancer diagnosis sends her on a quest to help her three teenage children get ready for the future.

The series was subsequently adapted into English as This Life, which premiered on CBC Television in 2015.

The series garnered 17 Gémeaux Award nominations in 2015, including nods as Best Drama Series, Best Actress in a Drama Series (Grenon), Best Supporting Actor in a Drama Series (Patrick Hivon, Antoine Pilon, Pierre Curzi), Best Supporting Actress in a Drama Series (Macha Limonchik, Muriel Dutil, Sophie Prégent) and Best Writing in a Drama Series (Blaimert).

Cast
Macha Grenon as Nathalie Lapointe
Monia Chokri as Magalie Lapointe
Patrick Hivon as Olivier Lapointe
Pierre Curzi as Gérald Lapointe
Jean-François Pichette as Laurent Lapointe
Muriel Dutil as Janine Leduc Lapointe
Mylène Dinh-Robic as Suki Bernier
Anthony Lemke as Tom Severson
Macha Limonchik as Danielle Bergeron
Antoine Pilon as Émile Lapointe
Sophie Prégent as Johanne Lemieux
Myriam Poirier as Marilyn

References

External links 
 

Ici Radio-Canada Télé original programming
Television shows filmed in Montreal
2014 Canadian television series debuts
2010s Canadian drama television series
Television series about single parent families
Television series about cancer
Television shows about death
2010s Canadian medical television series